Samuel Alex also known as Sam Alex is an American radio and TV personality. He is the host of the radio program "The Sam Alex Show" which is syndicated by the Sun Broadcast Group. Alex is a Special Correspondent for the American syndicated entertainment television news magazine show Celebrity Page.

Career
For 5 years Alex was host of "Taste of Country Nights" a five-hour nightly radio show distributed by Townsquare Media to more than 100 stations nationwide. On May 8, 2019, Alex fulfilled a lifelong dream by producing and syndicating "The Sam Alex Show".[6].

In 2016, Alex appeared as himself on an episode of Nashville on ABC. Alex is one of the best interviewers in the business and is known for putting his guests at complete ease and getting exclusive content. In 2021, Sam Alex got hired at Glenbrook North High School and assist's Students with their Broadcasting and Radio Program.

Awards
 In 2019, Alex received the Illinois State University “Outstanding Young Alumni Award.”
 In 2016 Alex was nominated for the Academy of Country Music Awards National On-Air Personality of the Year.
 Edison Research and RAIN honored Alex in their Audio's 30 Under 30 list in 2014.
 Alex won the Indiana Broadcasters Association Spectrum Award for Personality of the Year in 2009.

Charity
Alex serves as a national ambassador for Get Caught Reading, a nationwide campaign to remind people how much fun it is to read. The organization is supported by the Association of American Publishers and has been supported by Alicia Keys, Dolly Parton, Spider-Man, Laura Bush and many more.

References

External links
 Official website
 

Living people
Television personalities from Chicago
Radio personalities from Chicago
Year of birth missing (living people)